Trümmerfilm was an aesthetic choice for those films made directly after World War II dealing with the impact of the battles in the countries at the center of the war. The style was mostly    used by filmmakers in the rebuilding film industries of Eastern Europe, Italy and the former Nazi Germany. The style is characterized by its use of location exteriors among the "rubble" of bombed-down cities to bring the gritty, depressing reality of the lives of the civilian survivors in those early years.

Notable films

 Die Mörder sind unter uns  (1946)
 Irgendwo in Berlin (1946)
 Ehe im Schatten (1947)
 ... Und über uns der Himmel (1947)
Razzia (1947)
 Zwischen gestern und morgen (1947)
 Film ohne Titel (1947)
Und finden dereinst wir uns wieder (1947)
 In jenen Tagen (1947)
 Straßenbekanntschaft (1948)
 Lang ist der Weg (1948)
 Germania anno zero (1948)
 Morituri (1948)
 (1948)
 Und wieder 48 (1948)
 Die Affaire Blum (1948)
 Der Apfel ist ab (1948)
 Berliner Ballade (1948)
 Liebe '47 (1949)
 Der Ruf (1949)
 Der Verlorene (1951)

A Foreign Affair (1948), The Search (1948) and The Third Man (1949) are examples of Hollywood films of the same period with European directors who made innovative use of location shooting of German and Austrian rubble.

Topics of the Rubble film

 Problems of returning soldiers
 The poverty, suffering and distress in post-war Germany
 Stunde Null
 Confrontation with the past, particularly with issues of collective guilt
 Crime and punishment
 War damage and war losses
 Life among the rubble
 Reconstruction

The rubble aesthetic
The desolation left as a consequence of the bombing that Germany endured before the end of World War II left the major German cities in shambles. However, unlike other cities, Berlin's structures had steel frames. This enabled many of them to remain standing, despite the bombings. This left jagged figures on the landscape, as well as a lot of rubble on the ground. Often, directors would have either horizontal or vertical shots of the rubble from a low angle.
The Murderers Are Among Us begins with a ground shot facing upwards showing a Berlin street, complete with piles of rubble, and destroyed buildings. The viewer sees several children running around, and the protagonist ambling up the street. The viewer also sees German citizens working together to clean up, and getting on with their lives, despite the devastation. Critics have observed similarities between the rubble film aesthetic and Weimar era Expressionism, as well as Romanticism. These features include gloomy environments, canted angles and chiaroscuro lighting, along with morally ambiguous protagonists. It has been argued by Gertrud Koch that, aside from the expressionist and neorealistic qualities of the Rubble Film, a major purpose of these films was to re-invigorate the German people, and instill a work ethic that would facilitate the reconstruction of Germany.

Filmpause
In the year after the war ended, no films were made. This one-year period is referred to as the Filmpause, and is due in large part to the destruction or seizure of Germany's film studios, as well as artistic uncertainty. Furthermore, people had little interest in seeing films, much less the facilities with which to do so. This uncertainty was caused by Hitler's delegitimization of conventional filmmaking practices, which forced filmmakers to reinvent their filmography methods, and film content. It was not until Wolfgang Staudte released The Murderers Are Among Us in 1946 that German cinema began to further develop.

Reception 
Originally, the name "Trümmerfilm" held negative connotation. These films were seen as a symbol of defeat and desolation. They symbolized the control that the German Nazis had over the German people, as well as the success of the Allies in destroying their country. Instead of offering a nostalgic attachment to what Germany was, it simply was a mark of trauma and despair. The German identity had been stripped by the Nazi party, and they felt that these films did little more than re-affirm the horrors that Germany suffered.

The genre has also received criticism for its whitewashing of Nazi history. In the film The Murderers Are Among Us, the female protagonist Susanne returns from a concentration camp and is shocked by the misery of Germans in the cities. A common trope in the rubble films is the highlighting of German soldiers' trauma at the expense of relegating the suffering of political and racial enemies of the Third Reich. The dwelling on wartime trauma is not in itself a cause for concern. But the omission of any depictions of Nazi violence, in a genre so consumed with expressing suffering, is a criticized feature of the Heimkehrerfilm, a genre centered around returning veterans' trauma and re-adjustment to civilian life.

Bibliography

Film genres
Cinema of Germany